Icon Norfolk (formerly Bank of America Center) is one of the major distinctive and recognizable features of Downtown Norfolk, Virginia, United States. The building was the tallest in the state of Virginia from 1967 to 1971, when it was overtaken by Richmond City Hall. The building has a long history in banking. In the late 2010s, the building was converted into an apartment tower and given its current name.

History 
The tower was constructed from 1965 to 1967 and designed by Skidmore, Owings & Merrill, one of Virginia's leading architectural firms of the period. The building was the tallest in the state of Virginia from 1967 to 1971, when it was overtaken by Richmond City Hall. Today, it is the second-tallest building in City of Norfolk.

The building has a long history in banking. Built as the original headquarters for Virginia National Bank (VNB), the building retained headquarters status for Sovran Bank, formed from the merger of VNB and First & Merchants Bank of Richmond in 1983. After a series of mergers beginning in 1990 (including NationsBank), the building became the regional office for its namesake Bank of America in 1998.

In 2010, local reports were published of the building losing tenants, especially to newer office towers in Downtown Norfolk, such as the Wells Fargo Center. However, shipping company Maersk Line Limited retained its headquarters in the building.

In late 2015, plans were announced to convert the building to a 300-unit luxury apartment tower with ground-level retail. The building was renamed Icon Norfolk, part of a larger project known as CityWalk which will also entail redeveloping an adjacent office building at 2 Commercial Place.

In August 2016, Bank of America announced its intent to relocate its offices (and its building-top signage) to the 999 Waterside Drive, the former Dominion Tower, a few blocks away. The tower has now been completely remodeled into Icon Norfolk apartments, and the address has been changed to 321 E. Main Street.

See also 
 Virginia National Bank Headquarters Historic District
 List of tallest buildings in Norfolk, Virginia

References

External links
 Icon Norfolk website

Office buildings in Norfolk, Virginia
Skyscraper office buildings in Norfolk, Virginia
Office buildings completed in 1967
Skidmore, Owings & Merrill buildings
Bank of America buildings
Buildings and structures in Norfolk, Virginia
Downtown Norfolk, Virginia